Midnight Cleaners is the third album by the Cleaners from Venus, self-released in December 1982. The album was reissued and remastered by Captured Tracks in 2012, although the album was given a small reissue on CD-r in 2001 on JARMusic.

Background
After releasing two albums, drummer Lol Elliott moved 200 miles away to live with his girlfriend at the time, effectively leaving the band. Newell continued recording music around this obstacle, which resulted in a heavier use of drum machines and home-made percussion instruments. The album was recorded entirely onto a 4-track tape in Newell's bedroom. The album cover was drawn and coloured by Newell as well.

Reception
In a retrospective review for the album, Pitchfork writer Ned Raggett praised how the album jumps from "polished and straightforward power-pop efforts" to "the slightly cryptic spoken word, sax, and beat mix of the title track".

Track listing

Personnel
Adapted from 2012 remastered edition liner notes.
Martin Newell – vocals, guitar, bass, drum machines, keyboards, electronics, glockenspiel
Lawrence "Lol" Elliott – "some drums and ideas"
Mick Brannan – saxophone
"Celia" – additional vocals on "Only a Shadow"

References

1982 albums